Nina MacLaughlin is an American writer. Her memoir Hammer Head: The Making of a Carpenter, discusses her decision to restart her career. MacLaughlin's work has also been published in Boston Magazine, LA Review of Books, Cosmopolitan, The Huffington Post, The Daily Beast and The Boston Globe.  She was also recognized in Refiner29's list of "21 New Authors You Need to Know."

Interviews 
 NPR
 New York Magazine
 The Millions

Books 
 Hammer Head: The Making of a Carpenter, New York: W. W. Norton & Company., 2015, 
 Wake, Siren: Ovid Resung, New York: Farrar, Straus and Giroux., 2019,

References 

Year of birth missing (living people)
Living people
American women writers
21st-century American women